Desmos zeylanicus is a plant species in the plant family Annonaceae within the genus Desmos. In Antiquity it was sometimes used as a Homeopathic treatment for Genital Warts, however, there is no scientific evidence to support this.

References

Annonaceae